Munganda is a village in East Godavari district of the Indian state of Andhra Pradesh. It is located in P.Gannavaram mandal of Amalapuram revenue division. and is part of Konaseema.

History 
The village dates back to the early 16th century and is an Agraharam. It is bounded by the Vasishta and Vainateya rivers on the West and Kowsika and Sankhyayana rivers on the East(All these are distributaries of Godavari). There is a tank near the village on the bund of which there were a number of raavi (ficus religiosa) trees. It is believed that sages in the past spent their time in peaceful penance under these trees. Therefore, the place was called Munikhanda Agraharam (place or plot of land of sages). Munganda is a corrupted form of the name. Originally there were three villages Bhanavipuram, Khandrika, and Agraharam which formed part of Peddapuram Samsthanam and which were gifted away to men of learning. Subsequently, they were combined into one village under the name Munganda. The Agraharam had a major concentration of Telugu Brahmin families belonging to the Vaidiki Veginadu subsect even though the numbers have declined over time due to migration.

Family names associated with Munganda include - Upadrasta, Khandrika, Mukku, Bontha, Korada, Goda, Govindu, Susarla, Mukkamala, Bhattam, Jaggubhatla, Cheemalapati, Gudimetla, Bhamidi, Mantravadi, Pinninti, Simhambhatla, Saraswatula, Peketi, Komali, Cherukuri, Kuchi, Merusomayejula, Nadiminti, Chelluri, Godavarti, Pulya, Penumarti, Mikkili, Kodamarti, Mahidhara, Godavari, Manda, Khandavalli, etc.

Scholars and intellectuals 
The place has been noted for great intellectuals that had made a name in several branches of Sanskrit learning viz., jyotishya, purana, nyaya, mimamsa, vyakarana, and dharma sastras. Well-known 17th century Sanskrit poet and critic, Upadrasta Jagannatha Panditaraja(1590-1670) had his roots in Munganda. Pulya Umamaheswara Sastry (1887-1959), a Sanskrit grammarian and president awardee lived in Munganda.Vijayendra Saraswati Swamigal,  the 70th Jagadguru of Kanchi Kamakoti Peetam, Kanchipuram belongs to the Mukkamala family of Munganda that migrated to Tamil Nadu some centuries ago.
 
Various other individuals of repute associated with Munganda include -  Goda Subrahmanya Sastry(Mimamsa Scholar), Korada Ramachandra Sastri(Author of first original Telugu Drama, Manjarimadhukariam), Korada Subbavadhani(ghanapāṭhī and Sanskrit Scholar), Upadrasta Ramaswamy Sastrulu(ghanapāṭhī & Somayaji), Cheemalapati Maridayya Somayaji (Jyotishyam), Simhambhatla Suryanarayana Siddhanti (Jyotishyam), Cherukuri ReddySastry (Mantra Sastram), Manda Balarama Sarma (noted flutist), Susarla Surya Bhagavat Sankara Sastry (founder of Visakha Music And Dance Academy (VMDA) Visakhapatnam), Pinninti MalluSastry (Tantra Sastram), Nadiminti Sarvamangaleswara Sastry (Sanskrit Poet & Grammarian), Khandavalli Venkatarama Dikshitulu(Social Service), Bhamidi Visweswarara Sarma(Freedom Movement), Bhamidi KrishnaAvadhanulu (Sanskrit scholar), Peketi Chelamavadhanulu & Ramasastrulu brothers (Sanskrit Scholars), Mahidhara Jaganmohan Rao (Telugu literature), Mahidhara Rammohan Rao (Telugu Literature), Khandavalli Lakshmi Ranjanam (Telugu Literature), Penumarti Viswanatha Sastry(Known by his pen name "Ajanta". Telugu writer & editor)), Mahidhara Nalinimohan(Indian Space scientist & Telugu writer).

Contribution to independence movement 
The village was always at the forefront during the Khadi movement when hundreds of spinning wheels and handlooms produced both rough and quality khadi during the days of the Swadesi Swarajya movements. Many individuals from this village took an active part in the freedom movement and had been jailed on many occasions.

Temples and worship 
The temples of Muleswaraswamy, Rajeswaraswamy, Venugopalaswamy, Mutyalamma, and a Ganapati Man- diram are the places of worship in the village. Ganapathi Navarathrulu is celebrated for nine days from Bhadrapada Suddha Chavithi (August–September). Sahasranamarchanas (repeating a thousand names of the Lord), recitation from Vedas, reading of Puranams and philosophical discussions are held. This festival is being celebrated for the past 120 years but is confined to this place only.

References 

Villages in East Godavari district